Eichhorst is a surname. Notable people with the name include:

Angelina Eichhorst, Dutch diplomat
Anja Eichhorst (born c. 1971), German swimmer
Franz Eichhorst (1885–1948), German painter
Hermann Eichhorst (1849–1921), German-Swiss internist
Rich Eichhorst (born 1933), American basketball player and sports official